Hungary competed at the 2011 World Championships in Athletics from August 27 to September 4 in Daegu, South Korea.

Team selection

A team of 14 athletes was
announced to represent the country
in the event.
The team will be led by Hammer thrower Krisztián Pars and discus thrower 
Zoltán Kővágó.

The following athletes appeared on the preliminary Entry List, but not on the Official Start List of the specific event, resulting in a total number of 12 competitors:

Medalists
The following competitor from Hungary won a medal at the Championships

Results

Men

Women

Heptathlon

References

External links
Official local organising committee website
Official IAAF competition website

Nations at the 2011 World Championships in Athletics
World Championships in Athletics
Hungary at the World Championships in Athletics